The 4th CARIFTA Games was held in Hamilton, Bermuda on March 29–31, 1975.

Participation (unofficial)

Detailed result lists can be found on the "World Junior Athletics History" website.  An unofficial count yields the number of about 76 athletes (66 junior (under-20) and 10 youth (under-17)) from about 6 countries:  Bahamas (6), Barbados (13), Bermuda (17), Guyana (4), Jamaica (20), Trinidad and Tobago (16).

Medal summary
Medal winners are published by category: Boys under 20 (Junior), Girls under 20 (Junior), Boys under 17 (Youth), and Girls under 17 (Youth).
Complete results can be found on the "World Junior Athletics History" website.

Boys under 20 (Junior)

Girls under 20 (Junior)

Boys under 17 (Youth)

Girls under 17 (Youth)

Medal table (unofficial)

References

External links
World Junior Athletics History

CARIFTA Games
International athletics competitions hosted by Bermuda
CARIFTA Games
CARIFTA
1975 in Caribbean sport